The Roman Catholic Archdiocese of Mwanza is the Metropolitan See for the Ecclesiastical province of Mwanza in Tanzania.

History
 1880: Established as Apostolic Vicariate of Nyanza from the Apostolic Vicariate of Central Africa in Sudan 
 1883: Renamed as Apostolic Vicariate of Victoria–Nyanza 
 April 10, 1929: Renamed as Apostolic Vicariate of Mwanza
 March 25, 1953: Promoted as Diocese of Mwanza
 November 18, 1987: Promoted as Metropolitan Archdiocese of Mwanza
 November 27, 2010: Territory lost to Roman Catholic Diocese of Bunda

Special churches
The seat of the archbishop is the Metropolitan Cathedral of the Epiphany in Mwanza.

Bishops
 Vicars Apostolic of Mwanza (Roman rite)
 Bishop Jean-Joseph Hirth, M. Afr. (1894.07.13 - 1912.12.12), appointed Vicar Apostolic of Kivu
 Bishop Joseph Franciskus Marie Sweens, M. Afr. (1912.12.12 - 1928.11.12)
 Bishop Antoon Oomen, M. Afr. (1929.03.18 – 1950)
 Bishop Joseph Blomjous, M. Afr. (1950.06.25 – 1953.03.25 see below)
 Bishops of Mwanza (Roman rite)
 Bishop Joseph Blomjous, M. Afr. (see above 1953.03.25 – 1965.10.15)
 Bishop Renatus Lwamosa Butibubage (1966.01.15 – 1987.11.18)
 Metropolitan Archbishops of Mwanza (Roman rite)
 Archbishop Anthony Mayala (1987.11.18 - 2009.08.20)
 Archbishop Jude Thaddaeus Ruwa'ichi, O.F.M.Cap. (2010.11.10 - 2018.06.21), appointed Coadjutor Archbishop of Dar-es-Salaam
 Archbishop Renatus Leonard Nkwande (2019.02.11 - )

Coadjutor Vicar Apostolic
Joseph Franciskus Marie Sweens, M. Afr. (1910-1912)

Auxiliary Bishop
Renatus Lwamosa Butibubage (1959-1965), appointed Bishop here

Other priests of this diocese who became bishops
Michael George Mabuga Msonganzila, appointed Bishop of Musoma in 2007
Renatus Leonard Nkwande, appointed Bishop of Bunda in 2010; later returned here as Archbishop

Suffragan dioceses
 Bukoba
 Bunda
 Geita
 Kayanga
 Musoma
 Rulenge-Ngara
 Shinyanga

See also
Roman Catholicism in Tanzania

Sources
 GCatholic.org

Mwanza
Mwanza
 
 
Mwanza